This is a list of town tramway systems in Denmark. It includes all tram systems in Denmark, past and present; cities with currently operating systems, and those systems themselves, are indicated in bold and blue background colored rows. The use of the diamond (♦) symbol indicates where there were (or are) two or more independent tram systems operating concurrently within a single metropolitan area.  Those tram systems that operated on other than standard gauge track (where known) are indicated in the 'Notes' column.

See also
 List of town tramway systems – parent article
 List of town tramway systems in Europe
 List of tram and light rail transit systems
 List of metro systems

References

 
Tram
Denmark